Jenny Victoria Funnell (born 20 May 1963) is a British actress best known for her role as Sandy in the long-running British sitcom As Time Goes By from 1992 to 2005.

Early life
Funnell was born in Kenya and has a twin sister. She moved to the UK when she was four years old, and attended the Webber Douglas Academy of Dramatic Art She initially started voice acting in radio drama while still a student at drama school, winning the Carleton Hobbs BBC Radio Drama Award in 1984.

Career
Her earliest television work was also in the British soap opera Brookside (1985), the police series Bergerac (BBC 1988), and the episode "Peril at End House" in Series 2 of Agatha Christie's Poirot (ITV 1990).

Funnell started taking on comedy parts with an appearance in the comedy/drama Boon (ITV 1989), and a role in the television movie Norbert Smith: A Life. Other comedy roles for TV have included a guest appearance in the Channel 4 newsroom sitcom Drop the Dead Donkey (1994) and the romantic comedy Love Soup (2005).

Between 1992 and 2005, Funnell appeared in 58 episodes of the popular BBC sitcom As Time Goes By, in the role of 'Sandy' alongside Judi Dench and Geoffrey Palmer. The show lasted for nine series and was aired on BBC One.

She later made guest appearances in the ITV hospital drama The Royal (2003), played two separate parts in the BBC's medical drama Doctors (2002 and 2004), and appeared in the ITV police series The Bill (2006).

Since 2009, she has voiced nine different characters in the FromSoftware series Dark Souls and Bloodborne.

Funnell is the voice of optical retail chain, Specsavers.

Her stage roles have included Sense and Sensibility at the Watermill Theatre, Bagnor, West Berkshire in April 2014, What the Butler Saw at The Haymarket Theatre in Basingstoke during September 2015, and A Murder Is Announced, which toured around the United Kingdom throughout 2019. Funnell was part of the original West-End cast of Michael Grandage's Hamlet, which starred Jude Law in the titular role. The production opened at the Donmar Warehouse in 2009. It then went to Denmark, performing in the gothic setting of Kronborg Castle, Shakespeare's inspiration for his fictionalised Elsinore, before finally transferring to the Broadhurst Theatre, on Broadway, in August 2009.

Personal life
Funnell and her husband, also an actor, live near Brighton in England. The couple have a daughter, who is also an actress.

Filmography

References

External links
 
 Jenny Funnell at As Time Goes By Central

1963 births
Living people
20th-century English actresses
21st-century English actresses
English television actresses
English radio actresses
People from Nairobi
English twins
Kenyan twins
Alumni of the Webber Douglas Academy of Dramatic Art